The Soviet submarine М-111 was a Malyutka-class (Series XII) short-range, diesel-powered attack submarine of the Soviet Navy. She was part of the Black Sea Fleet and operated during the World War II against Axis shipping, her commander was the Georgian-ethnic Yaroslav Iosseliani before he was moved to another vessel.

Service history
M-111 served in the southern Black Sea, attacking Axis shipping with torpedoes.

References 

1940 ships
Soviet M-class submarines
Ships built in the Soviet Union
World War II submarines of the Soviet Union